The Enclosure (1961) is a novel by Susan Hill. Hill wrote the novel when she was 15 years old.

References

Novels by Susan Hill
1961 British novels
Hutchinson (publisher) books
1961 debut novels